The 1969 Campeonato Ecuatoriano de Fútbol was the 11th national championship for football teams in Ecuador. LDU Quito won their first national title.

Teams
Fourteen teams participated this season (home city in parentheses).
América (Ambato)
América (Quito)
Aucas (Quito)
Barcelona (Guayaquil)
Deportivo Quito (Quito)
El Nacional (Quito)
Emelec (Guayaquil)
Everest (Guayaquil)
INECEL (Manta)
LDU Quito (Quito)
Manta Sport (Manta)
Norte América (Guayaquil)
Patria (Guayaquil)
Universidad Católica (Quito)

Standings

Results

Record match
The Serie A record for the largest margin of victory was set this season on October 26. LDU Quito beat América de Ambato 11–0 in Ambato. In this game, Uruguayan Francisco Bertocchi also set a record for individual goalscoring in a single match with 8 goals.

References

External links
Official website 

1969
Ecu
Football